Diego Fernando Klimowicz (born 6 July 1974) is an Argentine former footballer who played as a centre-forward.

He started and finished his 18-year professional career with Instituto, but competed mostly in Spain and Germany, notably amassing Bundesliga totals of 213 games and 71 goals in the latter country.

Club career
Born in Quilmes, Buenos Aires, Klimowicz started his career at Instituto Atlético Central Córdoba in the Primera B Nacional. He was sold to Rayo Vallecano of La Liga in 1996, scoring 11 goals in his first season but being relegated to Segunda División; the latter club was later banned from buying or selling foreign players, for failing to pay the accorded sum of 240 million pesetas.

Klimowicz returned to the Spanish top division in December 1997, when he signed a four-and-a-half-year contract with Real Valladolid. After netting just seven times across all competitions during his spell at the Estadio José Zorrilla, however, he returned to his country in 1999 and joined Club Atlético Lanús.

Klimowicz was transferred to VfL Wolfsburg in December 2001, going on to remain in Germany – and its Bundesliga – for the better part of the following decade. He netted a career-best 15 goals in the 2003–04 campaign, helping his team finish in tenth place.

In May 2007, Klimowicz moved to fellow league side Borussia Dortmund on a two-year deal. On 25 August, his brace was crucial to the hosts' 3–0 home defeat of FC Energie Cottbus. He added four goals in their runner-up run in the DFB-Pokal, being booked as a second-half substitute in the decisive match, lost 2–1 to FC Bayern Munich after extra time.

In the 2008–09 winter transfer window, Klimowicz signed with VfL Bochum. On 2 March 2010, the 35-year-old announced his retirement from professional football due to a hip injury;

Klimowicz decided to come back from retirement on 24 December 2010, and re-joined his first team Instituto on a one-year contract.

International career
In 2001, there were talks of Klimowicz playing either for the Poland or the Ukraine national teams, but at the end nothing became materialised.

Personal life
Klimowicz's younger brother, Javier, was also a footballer, as well as his other sibling Nicolás; a goalkeeper, Javier won caps for Ecuador. Klimowicz's grandfather was born in Poland before World War II, in a territory that later became part of Ukraine. His son Mateo was also involved in the sport.

Career statistics

Honours
Borussia Dortmund
DFB-Pokal runner-up: 2007–08

References

External links

1974 births
Living people
People from Quilmes
Argentine people of Polish descent
Argentine people of Ukrainian descent
Argentine footballers
Association football forwards
Argentine Primera División players
Primera Nacional players
Instituto footballers
Club Atlético Lanús footballers
La Liga players
Segunda División players
Rayo Vallecano players
Real Valladolid players
Bundesliga players
VfL Wolfsburg players
Borussia Dortmund players
VfL Bochum players
Argentine expatriate footballers
Expatriate footballers in Spain
Expatriate footballers in Germany
Argentine expatriate sportspeople in Spain
Argentine expatriate sportspeople in Germany
Sportspeople from Buenos Aires Province